Dušan Vlahović (born 28 January 2000) is a Serbian professional footballer who plays as a forward for  club Juventus and the Serbia national team.

Graduating from Partizan's youth system, Vlahović made his first-team debut in 2016, winning a league title and two Serbian Cups. He moved to Italian club Fiorentina in 2018. With 21 league goals in the 2020–21 Serie A, Vlahović was awarded Serie A Best Young Player. After an impressive goalscoring form in the first half of 2021–22, Italian rivals Juventus signed him in January 2022 for a reported fee of €70 million.

Vlahović is a former Serbia youth international, representing his country at various youth levels, before making his senior international debut in 2020 during the UEFA Nations League.

Club career

Early career 
Born in Belgrade, Vlahović started playing football in the Altina Zemun football school, where he competed mostly with older players. Shortly after, he joined OFK Beograd's youth system for three months, and also made one appearance for Red Star Belgrade.

Partizan 
In summer 2014, Vlahović ended up joining rivals Partizan. He signed his first professional contract with Partizan in 2015, only aged 15. In early 2016, Vlahović joined the first team under coach Ivan Tomić and was given the jersey number 9. He made his Serbian SuperLiga debut on 21 February against OFK Beograd, as the Partizan's youngest debutant in history. In the next fixture, played on 27 February, Vlahović became the youngest player to play the Eternal derby, in which he was substituted on for the beginning of the second half.

On 2 April, Vlahović scored his first career goal for Partizan against Radnik Surdulica in a 3–2 home win, and became the youngest scorer in club history. He also scored a goal in a semi-final cup match against Spartak Subotica on 20 April, winning 3–0 away. He was scouted by a number of established European teams, including Arsenal, Anderlecht and Juventus with Partizan declining all offers. Vlahović scored a goal in the 2015–16 Serbian Cup final against Javor Ivanjica, helping his side win 2–0.

Vlahović played his first match in the new season against Zagłębie Lubin on 21 July, in the second leg of the 2016–17 UEFA Europa League second qualifying round; it was his European debut for Partizan. Vlahović started his first match in the second fixture of the 2016–17 league season, in an away match against Napredak Kruševac.

Fiorentina

2019–2021: first seasons 
In June 2017, Vlahović signed a five-year preliminary contract with Fiorentina, which became official on his 18th birthday, on 28 January 2018. Vlahović was officially bought by Fiorentina on 22 February 2018, choosing to wear the number 18. Due to administrative norms, he was not available to play until 1 July 2018. Initially registered to Fiorentina's under-19s, Vlahović, aged 18, made his senior debut for Fiorentina on 25 September 2018, in a 2–1 Serie A defeat to Inter Milan; in the process, he became the first player born in the 2000s to represent the club. On 9 December, he became the first player born in the 2000s to start for the Viola, featuring in a 3–3 away draw to Sassuolo. He made 10 appearances with the first team in the 2018–19 season. During that season, Vlahović won the 2018–19 Coppa Italia Primavera, scoring a brace against Torino in the first leg of the final, and a penalty in the second leg.

In the following season, Vlahović was de facto included in the first team. On 18 August 2019, Vlahović scored his first goals with Fiorentina, a brace in a 3–1 win against Monza in the third round of the 2019–20 Coppa Italia. His first goals came on 10 November, scoring a brace in a 5–2 away defeat against Cagliari. Vlahović ended the season with eight goals in 34 appearances.

2020–2022: Breakthrough and Serie A Best Young Player 
In the 2020–21 season, Vlahović found more and more space as a starter, especially after the arrival of Cesare Prandelli at the helm of Fiorentina. On 22 December 2020, he contributed with a goal to Fiorentina's away win in Turin over Juventus (3–0), which marked the first victory of the Viola at the home of the Bianconeri after 12 years. On 13 March 2021, Vlahović scored his first career hat-trick in a 4–1 away win over Benevento. He ended the year with 21 total goals, winning the title of Serie A Best Young Player.

Vlahović started the 2021–22 season by scoring a brace in a 4–0 win against Cosenza in the first round of the 2021–22 Coppa Italia. On 31 October 2021, he scored a hat-trick in a 3–0 win over Spezia. On 19 December 2021, Vlahović scored his 33rd Serie A goal of the calendar year; he became the only player, alongside Cristiano Ronaldo in 2020, to do so since 1951. In his previous season-and-a-half at Fiorentina, Vlahović scored 38 league goals, more than any other active player in the same time period. He was also the only player in Europe's top-five leagues born after 2000, alongside Erling Haaland, to have scored at least 40 goals in Europe's top-five leagues.

Juventus 
Media reports centred heavily on Arsenal's pursuit of Vlahović, however on 28 January 2022, his 22nd birthday, Vlahović signed for Juventus on a four-and-a-half-year contract; in a deal was worth €70 million, plus €10 million in performance-related bonuses, making him the most expensive transfer in the Serie A winter transfer window. Fiorentina president, Rocco Comisso in an interview later remarked of Vlahović' agents; 'it was clear to everyone they already had a deal with someone...', alluding that his entourage had already given a secret agreement with Juventus in the months prior. He chose to wear the number 7 jersey, previously worn by Cristiano Ronaldo. He debuted for Juventus as a starter on 6 February, and scored the opening goal in a 2–0 win against Hellas Verona. On 22 February, Vlahović made his first appearance in the UEFA Champions League, a 1–1 away draw against Villareal. He scored after only 33 seconds, becoming the fastest starting debutant and the second-youngest Juventus debutant to score in the Champions League. Four days later, he scored his first brace for Juventus, helping his side win 3–2 away to Empoli.

On 16 April, Vlahović became the second-youngest non-Italian player to score 50 goals in Serie A, after Alexandre Pato, with his late equaliser in a 1–1 draw against Bologna. On 11 May, he scored a 52nd-minute goal in Juventus' 4–2 loss to Inter in the 2022 Coppa Italia Final, which had given Juventus the lead. Despite losing the final, Vlahović finished as the top scorer of the competition with four goals, with the other three being scored during his time with Fiorentina. Five days later, he scored his 24th goal of the season in the 2–2 home draw against Lazio, to become the highest-scoring Serbian player in Serie A history, alongside Dejan Stanković.

On 1 July, Vlahović changed his jersey number from 7 to 9, ahead of the 2022–23 season. On matchday one of the Serie A, on 15 August, he scored a brace in a 3–0 home win over Sassuolo.

International career

Youth 
Vlahović was a member of the Serbia national under-15 team, scoring a hat trick in a match against the Czech Republic on 16 April 2015. He was also called up to the under-16 squad in late 2015, making his debut against Poland on 27 October 2015. In August 2016, Vlahović was called up to the under-19 squad for the Stevan Vilotić memorial tournament, where he debuted in the opening match against the United States. In the second match of the same tournament, he scored a goal against France. After Serbia beat Israel in the final match, Vlahović was nominated for the most talented player of the tournament.

Senior 
Vlahović made his senior team debut on 11 October 2020, in a 2020–21 UEFA Nations League game against Hungary. He scored his first international goal on 18 November, in a 5–0 home win over Russia in the Nations League. Afterwards, Vlahović embarked on a prolific goalscoring form for his national team, with his four goals, including a brace against Azerbaijan on 12 October 2021, proving to be crucial as Serbia secured qualification to the 2022 FIFA World Cup at top of their qualifying group ahead of the former European champions, Portugal, after defeating them 2–1 away from home.

In November, 2022 he was selected in Serbia's squad for the 2022 FIFA World Cup in Qatar. He played in group stage matches against Brazil and Switzerland, scoring against them in a 3–2 loss, as Serbia finished bottom of their group.

Style of play 
Vlahović is a complete striker, known for his physicality, technique and eye for goal. He excels at picking up the ball in central areas or the inside right or left channels and maintaining possession. He has multiple facets to his hold up and link play. His best assets are his strength to hold up the ball, and then his ability to turn and dribble past the first defender. When playing for Fiorentina, he often received the ball under pressure from either a long ball or linking with his midfielders.

Vlahović is a very efficient ball carrier, and his primary way to retain possession and circulate the ball is to use his strength in the contact and to use his superior dribbling ability to evade his marker. He is able to draw in opposition defenders and create space for his team mates or for himself with dribbling. Vlahović is a potent and clinical penalty box presence, a devastating finisher in the penalty area, as he is able to hold his position in order to pin the opposition back into their box, before swiftly making a movement into the channels as his team look to locate areas within the final third. His playing style has led him to be compared to Cristiano Ronaldo, Erling Haaland and Jamie Vardy.

Personal life 
Vlahović's idols are Zlatan Ibrahimović and Stevan Jovetić. Vlahović follows Moto GP. He has also played basketball since 2004.

Career statistics

Club

International 

 Scores and results list Serbia's goal tally first, score column indicates score after each Vlahović goal.

Honours 

Partizan
 Serbian SuperLiga: 2016–17
 Serbian Cup: 2015–16, 2016–17

Fiorentina Primavera
 Coppa Italia Primavera: 

Juventus
 Coppa Italia runner-up: 2021–22

Individual
 Serie A Best Young Player: 2020–21
 Serie A Player of the Month: December 2021
 Coppa Italia top scorer: 2021–22 (4 goals)
 Serie A Team of the Year: 2021–22

References

External links 

Profile at the Juventus F.C. website
 

2000 births
Living people
Footballers from Belgrade
Serbian footballers
Association football forwards
FK Partizan players
ACF Fiorentina players
Juventus F.C. players
Serbian SuperLiga players
Serie A players
Serbia youth international footballers
Serbia under-21 international footballers
Serbia international footballers
Serbian expatriate footballers
Expatriate footballers in Italy
Serbian expatriate sportspeople in Italy
2022 FIFA World Cup players